Zuleh may refer to:

Zuleh, Kermanshah
Zuleh, Lorestan